James Joseph Mullen (born June 1970) is a Scottish businessman, the chief executive (CEO) of Reach plc, the UK's largest commercial news publisher, with titles including the Daily Mirror, the Daily Express and InYourArea. He is the former CEO of Ladbrokes, the high street betting chain.

Early life
James Joseph Mullen was born in June 1970. He was born in Glasgow, and grew up with his grandparents, who taught him about betting.

Mullen was educated at John Ogilvie High School in Hamilton, South Lanarkshire. He has a bachelor's degree in computing from Glasgow Caledonian University, and a master's degree in software engineering.

Career
On 1 April 2015, Mullen succeeded Richard Glynn as CEO of Ladbrokes, where he had previously been managing director of Ladbrokes Digital since October 2013. In July 2015, it was announced he would become CEO of Ladbrokes Coral, a new company borne out of a merger between Ladbrokes and smaller high street betting chain Gala Coral, with Ladbrokes Coral later being acquired by GVC Holdings in December 2017. Mullen stood down as CEO in March 2018.

Personal life
Mullen is married with two sons.

References

1970 births
Living people
Alumni of Glasgow Caledonian University
British chief executives
Businesspeople from Glasgow
People educated at John Ogilvie High School